The V-League (Philippines) conference results present the final rankings of each conference in the V-League. Starting as the Shakey's V-League from 2004 to 2016, it transformed into Premier Volleyball League in 2017. The men's division became the Spikers' Turf in 2015.

The V-League makes its resumption in the volleyball scene in 2022 catering male and female collegiate teams.

Shakey's V-League (2004–2016)

Results

All-stars

Awards

V-League (2022–present)

Results

Awards

References

External links
 www.vleague.ph - Official website

Shakey's V-League